Xavierian Primary School is a public, national day school located in Kisumu County, close to the shores of Lake Victoria, in Nyanza Province, Kenya. Established in 1956, it is one of the oldest schools in Kenya.

History and operations
The foundation stone was laid by Rt. Rev. F. Hall D.D., the Bishop of Kisumu on 18 September 1955 and was opened by Dr. A. Ressano Garcia (the Consul General for Portugal) on 22 July 1956.

Dubbed the "Foundation of Excellence", the school attracts pupils from all social classes in Kisumu. The school's first influential head teachers and administrators include Mr. V. Z. Patel, Mrs. Caroline Tado, and Mr. Donald Meda. Their illustrious administration styles coupled with discipline attracted other like minded teachers who propelled the school into an academic oasis not only in Kisumu, but the entire Nyanza Province. In the past, many pupils have earned the Kenya Certificate of Primary Education and joined competitive secondary education institutions. 

The school has three streams, named in Kiswahili after Africa's big cats "Simba" - Lion, "Chui" - leopard and "Duma" - cheetah.

The academic success of the primary school allowed the formation of Xavierian Secondary School. This was a result of the continued good performance of the standard eight pupils and limited space in comparable secondary institutions in the area.

See also 
 Education in Kenya
 List of schools in Kenya

References 

1950s establishments in Kenya
1955 establishments in Africa
Education in Nyanza Province
Educational institutions established in 1955
Kisumu County
Elementary and primary schools in Kenya
Public schools in Kenya
1955 establishments in the British Empire